Following is a list of high school teams that have competed in the Long Island Football Championship games on Long Island, New York.

The championship pits the winner of the "Big 4" divisions in Nassau County, New York against the winner of the divisions in Suffolk County, New York.

New York State does not have a true state championship game as the Long Island teams, and teams from the Catholic High School Athletic Association, as well as those in New York City do not compete in the New York State Public High School Athletic Association football championship which decides a winner for all public schools outside of New York City and Long Island.

References

Education in Suffolk County, New York
Education in Nassau County, New York
High school football games in the United States
New York (state) sports-related lists